Neruda may refer to:

People
 Neruda (surname), a list of people with the surname
 Jan Neruda (1834—1891), Czech journalist, writer, and poet
 Johann Baptist Georg Neruda (—), classical Czech composer
 Pablo Neruda (1904—1973), Chilean poet-diplomat and politician

Arts and entertainment
 Neruda (album), 1983 studio album by Canadian band Red Rider
 Quilapayún Chante Neruda, 1983 compilation music album by Quilapayún
 Neruda, 2004 album by jazz artist Luciana Souza featuring the work of Pablo Neruda
 Neruda (film), 2016 Chilean film about Pablo Neruda

Astronomy
 1875 Neruda, a main-belt asteroid
 Neruda (crater), a crater on Mercury

Other uses
 Neruda (genus), a subgenus of the butterfly genus Heliconius, in the family Nymphalidae